Swarnalatha (29 April 1973 – 12 September 2010) was an Indian playback singer. In a career spanning almost 22 years (from 1987 until her death), she recorded over 10,000 songs in many Indian  languages, including Tamil, Malayalam, Telugu, Kannada, Hindi, Urdu, Bengali, Oriya, Punjabi, and Badaga. 

She won the National Film Award for Best Female Playback Singer for her rendition of the song "Porale Ponnuthayi" from the film Karuththamma. The song was composed by A. R. Rahman, under whose musical direction she recorded many memorable songs. She was also the first female playback singer to get a National Award In A. R. Rahman Music.

Personal life
She was born in Kerala, to K. C. Cherukutty and Kalyani. Her father was a harmonium player and singer. Her mother also had interest in music. Swarnalatha was trained to play harmonium and keyboard. Swarnalatha's family later moved to Bhadravathi in Shivamogga District, Karnataka where she had her education. She started singing at the age of 3. Surrounded by a family of musicians and music lovers, Swarnalatha was trained in Carnatic and Hindustani music. Her sister Saroja was her first music teacher.

Career
Swarnalatha's family moved to Chennai to seek opportunities in the film industry for her singing talent. The first opportunity came from M. S. Viswanathan in 1987 when she performed a duet with K. J. Yesudas, "Chinnachiru Kiliye" in the film Neethikku Thandanai. Subsequently, she was approached by many other music directors to perform songs under their baton. She also had the opportunity to work with the director P. Venu. She was recruited by musicians like Ilaiyaraaja and A. R. Rahman. She also recorded a few Hindi songs, the most notable one being "Hai Rama Yeh Kya Hua" from the film Rangeela with singer Hariharan.
  
In Telugu, she recorded more songs under the music direction of Mani Sharma, Ramana Gogula, Raj–Koti, and Vandemataram Srinivas. They include top-rated songs like Raamma Chilakamma, Osey Ramulamma, and Nizam Babulu. A. R. Rahman employed Swarnalatha for many of his songs. She was one of the most versatile singers of her times, as she was able to sing melodies like "Maalayil Yaaro Manathodu Pesa" from Sathriyan or "Porale Ponnuthayi" from Karuthamma as well as Rahman's experimental songs like "Mukkabla" from Kadhalan or "Mottu Vittadha" from Pavithra. 

Swarnalatha was the first female playback singer to fetch the National Award under A. R. Rahman's music direction. She received the award for the song "Porale Ponnuthayi". She recorded many songs with music directors Deva, Vidyasagar, Harris Jayaraj, Anu Malik, Shankar–Ehsaan–Loy, Raj–Koti, Yuvan Shankar Raja, Mani Sharma, Hamsalekha and many others.

She recorded all the songs initially rendered by Lata Mangeshkar and Shamshad Begum for the Tamil movie Anarkali (the dubbed version of the Hindi movie Mughal-e-Azam) and was praised by the Bollywood music director Naushad Ali, which she considered the best moment in her career.

Television

Swarnalatha appeared as a judge in many television singing competitions, notably in the 2001 Vijay TV reality show and in the 2004 Jaya TV Ragamalika.

Death
Swarnalatha died at Malar Hospitals Ltd Adayar, Chennai at the age of 37, on 12 September 2010. She had Idiopathic lung disease.

Awards and recognitions

National Award (Silver Lotus Award)-(Rajat Kamal)
 1994– National Film Award for Best Female Playback Singer for "Porale Ponnuthayi" from Karuththamma

Tamil Nadu State Film Awards
 1991 – Tamil Nadu State Film Award for Best Female Playback for "Povomma Oorkolam" from Chinna Thambi
 1994 – Tamil Nadu State Film Award for Best Female Playback for "Porale Ponnuthayi" from Karuththamma
 2000 – Tamil Nadu State Film Award for Best Female Playback for "Evano oruvan" from Alaipayuthey

Cinema Express Awards
 1991 – Best Female Playback Singer for "Povomma Oorkolam" from Chinna Thambi
 1995 – Best Female Playback Singer for "Muquala Muqapala" from Kadhalan
 1996 – Best Female Playback Singer for "Akkadannu nanga" from Indian
 1999 – Best Female Playback Singer for "Ulunthu vidaikayile" from Mudhalvan
 2000 – Best Female Playback Singer for "Yevano Oruvan " from Alaipayuthey
Government Honour
 1994– Kalaimamani Award by the Government of Tamil Nadu

Recognition
 2002 – The song "Rakkama Kaiya Thattu" from the movie Thalapathi (1991) was among the songs listed in a BBC World Top Ten music poll. It was performed by S. P. Balasubrahmaniyam and Swarnalatha

Frequent collaboration

Ilaiyaraja
She has sung over 200 songs for Ilayaraja and marked as one of the noted combinations in 90's. 'Povomaa Oorkolam' and 'Nee Yengae Enn Anbae' from the film Chinnathambi were hits. Government of Tamil Nadu honoured her with the award of Best Singer for the song 'Povomaa Oorkolam'.

The song 'Raakkamma Kayyathattu' from the film Thalapathi figured in BBC's Hits List of World Songs.

She had sung several experimental songs for Ilayaraja such as "Sollividu VelliNilave', "Kanne Indru Kalyana Kathai" and "Ennai Thottu Allikonda".

A. R. Rahman
A. R. Rahman and Swarnalatha association started from the year 1993. Their Combination is known for the magical songs such as "Mukkala Mukkabala", "Hai Rama yeh kya hua", which are the hit songs of 90's. She was the first female singer to receive National Award under Rahman's Music for the song "Porale ponnuthayi" from karuthama released in the year 1994. She has sung nearly 80 songs for Rahman.

Discography

References

External links
 

1973 births
2010 deaths
Indian women playback singers
Tamil singers
Malayalam playback singers
Respiratory disease deaths in India
Tamil Nadu State Film Awards winners
Filmfare Awards South winners
Tamil playback singers
Kannada playback singers
Telugu playback singers
Recipients of the Kalaimamani Award
20th-century Indian singers
People from Palakkad district
Singers from Kerala
Film musicians from Kerala
Women musicians from Kerala
21st-century Indian women singers
20th-century Indian women singers
21st-century Indian singers
Best Female Playback Singer National Film Award winners
Deaths from pulmonary fibrosis